Hereditas (not to be confused with another journal called Heredity) is a scientific journal concerning genetics.  It has been published since 1920 by Mendelska sällskapet i Lund (Mendelian Society of Lund). In its long history it has published important papers in the field of genetics, including the first discovery of the correct human chromosome count by Joe Hin Tijo and Albert Levan in 1956. In the post-genomic era, the scope of Hereditas has evolved to include any research on genomic analysis.

In 2005, Hereditas changed from a traditional subscription-based journal to become an open access, web based and author funded journal. By the end of 2014, Hereditas terminated its activity with Wiley Publishers. In May 2015 Hereditas was re-launched and became part of the portfolio of the open access publisher Biomed Central (BMC), now owned by Springer Nature.

It is indexed by BIOSIS, DOAJ, MEDLINE, Science Citation Index, and Scopus. The impact factor (IF) of 2019 is 2.4.

Editors-in-chief (EiC): Robert Larsson (1920–1954), Arne Müntzing (1955–1977), Arne Lundqvist (1978–1988), Karl Fredga and Arne Lundqvist (1989–1996), Ulf Gyllensten (1996–2001), Anssi Saura (2002-2011), Stefan Baumgartner (2012 -), Yongyong Shi (2016 -, in parallel to Baumgartner).

References

External links 

Publications established in 1920
Genetics journals
BioMed Central academic journals